Carbaldrate (dihydroxyaluminum sodium carbonate) is an antacid.

References

Antacids
Aluminium compounds